Clark International Airport is the former Clark Air Base, serving the Clark Freeport Zone, Angeles City, Philippines, IATA airport code CRK, ICAO airport code RPLC.

Clark Airport may also refer to:
Clark Air Base, the present-day Philippine Air Force installation
Clark Airport (Massachusetts), an airfield operational in the mid-20th century in Hanover, Massachusetts, United States
Clark Airport (Texas), a general aviation airport serving Justin, Texas, United States, FAA location identifier 3T6
Clark County Airport, a public-use airport in Clark County, South Dakota, United States, FAA location identifier 8D7
Clark Regional Airport, a public use airport in Clark County, Indiana, United States, ICAO code KJVY, FAA location identifier JVY

See also
Clark Field (disambiguation)